Alex Katz (born July 24, 1927) is an American figurative artist known for his paintings, sculptures, and prints.

Early life and career
Alex Katz was born July 24, 1927, to a Jewish family in Brooklyn, New York, as the son of an émigré who had lost a factory he owned in Russia to the Soviet revolution. In 1928 the family moved to St. Albans, Queens, where Katz grew up.

From 1946 to 1949 Katz studied at the Cooper Union in New York, and from 1949 to 1950 he studied at the Skowhegan School of Painting and Sculpture in Maine. Skowhegan exposed him to painting from life, which would prove pivotal in his development as a painter and remains a staple of his practices today. Katz explains that Skowhegan's plein air painting gave him "a reason to devote my life to painting." Every year from early June to mid-September, Katz moves from his SoHo loft to a 19th-century clapboard farmhouse in Lincolnville, Maine. A summer resident of Lincolnville since 1954, he has developed a close relationship with local Colby College. From 1954 to 1960, he made a number of small collages of still lifes, Maine landscapes, and small figures. He met Ada Del Moro, who had studied biology at New York University, at a gallery opening in 1957. In 1960, Katz had his first (and only) son, Vincent Katz. Vincent Katz had two sons, Isaac and Oliver, who have been the subjects of Katz's paintings.

Katz has admitted to destroying a thousand paintings during his first ten years as a painter in order to find his style. Since the 1950s, he worked to create art more freely in the sense that he tried to paint "faster than [he] can think." His works seem simple, but according to Katz they are more reductive, which is fitting to his personality. "(The) one thing I don't want to do is things already done. As for particular subject matter, I don't like narratives, basically."

Work
Katz achieved great public prominence in the 1980s. He is well known for his large paintings, whose bold simplicity and heightened colors are now seen as precursors to Pop Art.

Artistic style
Katz's paintings are divided almost equally into the genres of portraiture and landscape. Since the 1960s he has painted views of New York (especially his immediate surroundings in Soho) and landscapes of Maine, where he spends several months every year, as well as portraits of family members, artists, writers and New York society protagonists. His paintings are defined by their flatness of colour and form, their economy of line, and their cool but seductive emotional detachment. A key source of inspiration is the woodcuts produced by Japanese artist Kitagawa Utamaro.

In the early 1960s, influenced by films, television, and billboard advertising, Katz began painting large-scale paintings, often with dramatically cropped faces. Ada Katz, whom he married in 1958, has been the subject of over 250 portraits throughout his career. To make one of his large works, Katz paints a small oil sketch of a subject on a masonite board; the sitting might take an hour and a half. He then makes a small, detailed drawing in pencil or charcoal, with the subject returning, perhaps, for the artist to make corrections. Katz next blows up the drawing into a "cartoon", sometimes using an overhead projector, and transfers it to an enormous canvas via "pouncing"—a technique used by Renaissance artists, involving powdered pigment pushed through tiny perforations pricked into the cartoon to recreate the composition on the surface to be painted. Katz pre-mixes all his colors and gets his brushes ready.

Beginning in the late 1950s, Katz developed a technique of painting on cut panels, first of wood, then aluminum, calling them "cutouts". These works would occupy space like sculptures, but their physicality is compressed into planes, as with paintings. In later works, the cutouts are attached to wide, U-shaped aluminum stands, with a flickering, cinematic presence enhanced by warm spotlights. Most are close-ups, showing either front-and-back views of the same figure's head or figures who regard each other from opposite edges of the stand.

After 1964, Katz increasingly portrayed groups of figures. He would continue painting these complex groups into the 1970s, portraying the social world of painters, poets, critics, and other colleagues that surrounded him. He began designing sets and costumes for choreographer Paul Taylor in the early 1960s, and he has painted many images of dancers throughout the years. One Flight Up (1968) consists of more than 30 portraits of some of the leading lights of New York's intelligentsia during the late 1960s, such as the poet John Ashbery, the art critic Irving Sandler and the curator Henry Geldzahler, who championed Andy Warhol. Each portrait is painted using oils on both sides of a sliver of aluminum that has then been cut into the shape of the subject's head and shoulders. The silhouettes are arranged predominantly in four long rows on a plain metal table.

After his Whitney exhibition in 1974, Katz focused on landscapes, stating, "I wanted to make an environmental landscape, where you were IN it."  In the late 1980s, Katz took on a new subject in his work: fashion models in designer clothing, including Kate Moss and Christy Turlington. "I've always been interested in fashion because it's ephemeral," he said.

Printmaking
In 1965, Katz also embarked on a prolific career in printmaking. Katz would go on to produce many editions in lithography, etching, silkscreen, woodcut and linoleum cut, producing over 400 print editions in his lifetime. The Albertina, Vienna, and the Museum of Fine Arts, Boston, hold complete collections of Katz' print oeuvre. A print catalogue raisonné is due for release by the Albertina in the fall of 2011.

Public commissions
In 1977, Katz was asked to create a work to be produced in billboard format above Times Square, New York City. The work, which was located at 42nd Street and 7th Avenue, consisted of a frieze composed of 23 portrait heads of women. The billboard extended  along two sides of the RKO General building and wrapped in three tiers above on a  tower. Katz was commissioned in 1980 by the US General Services Administration's Art in Architecture Program to create an oil-on-canvas mural in the new United States Attorney's Building at Foley Square, New York City. In 2005, Katz participated in a public art project titled "Paint in the City", commissioned by United Technologies Corporation and organized by Creative Time. Located on the corner of the Bowery and East Fourth Street in the East Village, the work was hand painted by sign painters and was installed during the summer of 2005.

Collaborations
Katz has collaborated with poets and writers since the 1960s, producing several notable editions such as "Face of the Poet" combining his images with poetry from his circle, such as Ted Berrigan, Ann Lauterbach, Carter Ratcliff, and Gerard Malanga. He has worked with the poet John Ashbery, creating publications entitled "Fragment" in 1966 and "Coma Berenices". in 2005. He has worked with Vincent Katz on "A Tremor in the Morning" and "Swimming Home". Katz also made 25 etchings for the Arion Press edition of Gloria with 28 poems by Bill Berkson. Other collaborators include Robert Creeley, with whom he produced "Edges" and "Legeia: A Libretto", and Kenneth Koch, producing "Interlocking Lives". In 1962, Harper's Bazaar incorporated numerous wooden cutouts by Katz for a four-page summer fashion spread.

Numerous publications outline Katz's career's many facets: from Alex Katz in Maine published by the Farnsworth Art Museum to the catalogue Alex Katz New York, published by the Irish Museum of Modern Art. Alex Katz Seeing Drawing, Making, published in 2008, describes Katz's multiple-stage process of first producing charcoal drawings, small oil studies, and large cartoons for placing the image on the canvas and the final painting of the canvas. In 2005, Phaidon Press published an illustrated survey, Alex Katz, by Carter Ratcliff, Robert Storr and Iwona Blazwick. In 1989, a special edition of Parkett was devoted to Katz, showing that he is now considered a major reference for younger painters and artists. Over the years, Francesco Clemente, Enzo Cucchi, Liam Gillick, Peter Halley, David Salle and Richard Prince have written essays about his work or conducted interviews with him.

Exhibitions
Since 1951, Katz's work has been the subject of more than 200 solo exhibitions and nearly 500 group exhibitions throughout the United States and internationally. Katz' first one-person show was an exhibition of paintings at the Roko Gallery in New York in 1954. In 1974 the Whitney Museum of American Art showed Alex Katz Prints, followed by a traveling retrospective exhibition of paintings and cutouts titled Alex Katz in 1986. The subject of over 200 solo exhibitions and nearly 500 group shows internationally, Katz has since been honored with numerous retrospectives at museums including the Whitney Museum of American Art, New York; Brooklyn Museum, New York; the Jewish Museum, New York; the Irish Museum of Modern Art, Dublin; Colby College Museum of Art, Maine; Staatliche Kunsthalle, Baden-Baden; Fondazione Bevilacqua La Masa, Venice; Centro de Arte Contemporáneo de Málaga; and the Saatchi Gallery, London (1998). In 1998, a survey of Katz' landscape paintings was shown at the P.S. 1 Contemporary Art Center, featuring nearly 40 pared-down paintings of urban or pastoral motifs.

Katz is represented by Gavin Brown's Enterprise in New York, Timothy Taylor Gallery in London, and Galerie Thaddaeus Ropac in Paris/Salzburg. Before showing with Brown, he had been represented by Pace Gallery for 10 years and by Marlborough Gallery for 30 years.

The prints of Alex Katz are distributed in Europe by Galerie Frank Fluegel in Nuremberg. A retrospective of his work is currently (June - October 2022) on display at the Thyssen National Museum of Spain, the first time Katz´s work has been displayed in that country.

Collections
Katz's work is in the collections of over 100 public institutions worldwide, including the Honolulu Museum of Art; the Museum of Modern Art, New York; the Metropolitan Museum of Art, New York; the Whitney Museum of American Art, New York; the Smithsonian Institution, Washington, D.C.; the Carnegie Museum of Art, Pittsburgh; the Art Institute of Chicago; the Cleveland Museum of Art; the Tate Gallery, London; the Centre Georges Pompidou, Paris; Museo Nacional Centro de Arte Reina Sofia, Madrid; the Metropolitan Museum of Art, Tokyo; the Nationalgalerie, Berlin; and the Museum Brandhorst, Munich. In 2010, Anthony d'Offay donated a group of works by Katz to the National Galleries of Scotland and the Tate; they are shown as part of the national touring programme, Artist Rooms. In 2011, Katz donated Rush (1971), a series of 37 painted life-size cutout heads on aluminum, to the Museum of Fine Arts, Boston; the piece is installed, frieze-like, in its own space.

Recognition
Throughout his career, Katz has been the recipient of numerous awards, including the John Simon Guggenheim Memorial Fellowship for Painting in 1972, and in 1987, both Pratt Institute's Mary Buckley Award for Achievement and the Queens Museum of Art Award for Lifetime Achievement. The Chicago Bar Association honored Katz with the Award for Art in Public Places in 1985. In 1978, Katz received a U.S. government grant to participate in an educational and cultural exchange with the USSR. Katz was awarded the John Simon Guggenheim Fellowship for Painting in 1972. Katz was inducted by the American Academy of Arts and Letters in 1988, and recognized with honorary doctorates by Colby College, Maine (1984), and Colgate University, Hamilton, New York (2005). In 1990 he was elected into the National Academy of Design as an associate member, and became a full Academician in 1994. He was named the Philip Morris Distinguished Artist at the American Academy in Berlin in 2001 and received the Cooper Union Annual Artist of the City Award in 2000. In addition to this honor, in 1994 Cooper Union Art School created the Alex Katz Visiting Chair in Painting with an endowment provided by the sale of ten paintings donated by the artist, a position first held by the painter and art critic Merlin James. In 2005, Katz was the honored artist at the Chicago Humanities Festival's Inaugural Richard Gray Annual Visual Arts Series. In 2007, he was honored with a Lifetime Achievement Award from the National Academy of Design, New York.

In October 1996, the Colby College Museum of Art opened a  wing dedicated to Katz that features more than 400 oil paintings, collages, and prints donated by the artist. In addition, he has purchased numerous pieces for the museum by artists such as Jennifer Bartlett, Chuck Close, Francesco Clemente, and Elizabeth Murray. In 2004, he curated a show at Colby of younger painters Elizabeth Peyton, Peter Doig and Merlin James, who work in the same figurative territory staked out by Katz.

In 1996, Vincent Katz and Vivien Bittencourt produced a video titled Alex Katz: Five Hours, documenting the production of his painting January 3, and in 2008 he was the subject of a documentary directed by Heinz Peter Schwerfel, entitled What About Style? Alex Katz: a Painter's Painter.

Legacy
Katz' work is said to have influenced many painters, such as David Salle, Helena Wurzel, Peter Halley and Richard Prince, as well as younger artists like Peter Doig, Julian Opie, Liam Gillick, Elizabeth Peyton, Barb Januszkiewicz, Johan Andersson, and Brian Alfred. Furthermore, it has become ubiquitous in advertising and graphic design.

Notes and references

Bibliography
Carter Ratcliff, Robert Storr, Iwona Blazwick, Barry Schwabsky, ALEX KATZ, Phaidon Press, 2014, 
Mark Rappolt, ALEX KATZ: FACE THE MUSIC, Galerie Thaddaeus Ropac, 2011, 
Klaus Albrecht Schröde, ALEX KATZ: PRINTS, Hatje Cantz, 2010, 
Roland Mönig, Guy Tosatto, Timo Valjakka, Eric de Chassey, ALEX KATZ: AN AMERICAN WAY OF SEEING, 2010, 
David A. Moos, ALEX KATZ: SEEING, DRAWING, MAKING, Windsor Press, 2008, 
Luca Cerizza, ALEX KATZ: FACES AND NAMES, JRP|Ringier, 2008, 
Enrique Juncosa,  Juan Manuel Bonet, Rachael Thomas, ALEX KATZ: NEW YORK, Charta / Irish Museum of Modern Art, 2007, 
Barry Schwabsky, ALEX KATZ: THE SIXTIES, Charta, 2006, 
David Cohen, Sharon Corwin, ALEX KATZ: COLLAGES, Colby College Museum of Art, Waterville, Maine, 2006, 
Carter Ratcliff, Robert Storr, Iwona Blazwick, ALEX KATZ, Phaidon, 2006,

External links

Alex Katz interviewed by Richard Prince

Alex Katz Collection at the Colby College Museum of Art
Alex Katz Collection at the Albertina
 Biography on Magical-Secrets.com
Artist Alex Katz Featured in J.Crew Catalog
"Ada with Sunglasses" tapestry by Alex Katz
Alex Katz in Conversation with Phong Bui (May 2009)
Alex Katz in Conversation with David Salle(March 2013)

Living people
20th-century American painters
American male painters
21st-century American painters
21st-century American male artists
American people of Russian-Jewish descent
Artists from New York (state)
Artists from Maine
American pop artists
People from Lincolnville, Maine
Jewish painters
Jewish American artists
20th-century American printmakers
Skowhegan School of Painting and Sculpture alumni
People from St. Albans, Queens
1927 births
21st-century American Jews
20th-century American male artists
Members of the American Academy of Arts and Letters